The Proposed Eastern United States missile defense site is a Ground-Based Midcourse Defense site that may be built in the eastern half of the United States.

 four sites were shortlisted - SERE Remote Training Site in Maine (Rangeley), Fort Drum in New York, Camp James A. Garfield in Ohio, and Fort Custer Training Center in Michigan.  Camp Ethan Allen Training Site in Vermont was dropped from consideration in late 2013. In June 2019, Fort Drum in New York was chosen as the location for the potential missile defense site.

History
In January 2014 the Pentagon announced they were starting a two-year environmental impact study under the 2013 defense authorization bill, which required two missile-defense sites to be identified on the East Coast. The CBO has estimated that a site would cost US$3.5bn.

References

Surface-to-air missile batteries of the United States
Military installations of the United States
Proposed installations of the United States Air Force